Mohammadreza Baouj is an Iranian football striker who plays for Saipa in the Persian Gulf Pro League.

References

1996 births
Living people
Iranian footballers
Saipa F.C. players
Association football forwards